Ewen Donald Cameron (born 7 November 1926) is an Australian retired Anglican bishop who served as an assistant bishop in the Anglican Diocese of Sydney. He was the Bishop of North Sydney from 1983 to 1990, and the Diocesan Registrar from 1990 to 1993.

Cameron was born in Leura to Ewen and Dulcie Cameron (née Parsons). He was educated at Sydney Church of England Grammar School. After an earlier career in accountancy he was ordained in 1959. He was a curate at Chatswood, New South Wales and then a lecturer at Moore Theological College until 1963. He was rector of Bellevue Hill, New South Wales and then Federal Secretary of CMS Australia until 1972. He was Archdeacon of Cumberland until his ordination to the episcopate on 24 June 1975 at St Andrew's Cathedral, Sydney. He served as an assistant bishop of the Diocese of Sydney from that day until his retirement in 1993, during which time he was also area bishop for North Sydney (1983–1990) and Diocesan Registrar (1990–1993).

He married his wife, Rosemary, in 1952, and the couple had three children.  Donald and Rosemary remained married up through her death in 2015.

References

1926 births
Living people
People educated at Sydney Church of England Grammar School
Academic staff of Moore Theological College
Anglican archdeacons in Australia
Evangelical Anglican bishops
20th-century Anglican bishops in Australia
Assistant bishops in the Anglican Diocese of Sydney